is a Japanese researcher of early Christianity and Gnosticism. Arai is a Doctor of Theology Professor emeritus of University of Tokyo and Keisen University, and a member of the Japan Academy. He graduated (1962) at Erlangen-Nürnberg University in Germany.

He and his wife (and daughter Keiko) lived in the early 1960s with the family of the later Bishop of Bavaria and President of the Lutheran World Congress, Johannes Hanselmann, in Grub am Forst, Oberfranken, Germany.

Arai was a pioneer of the studies of Gnosticism after the discovery of the Nag Hammadi library.

Works

Books

Edited by

References

1930 births
20th-century biblical scholars
Living people
New Testament scholars
University of Erlangen-Nuremberg alumni
University of Tokyo alumni
Academic staff of Keisen University
Asian biblical scholars